Obsessed by Cruelty is the debut full-length studio album and the second release by German thrash metal band Sodom, released in 1986. Two different versions of the album exist, the European and the American, which were released by Steamhammer and Metal Blade Records.

Release 
Two different versions of the album exist. The band had to record the album twice because their record company was not satisfied with the original result. The first version was recorded in Berlin, and was released on vinyl by Metal Blade Records in the United States in 1986. The second version was recorded in Nuremberg, and was released by Steamhammer Records in their home country of Germany in the same year. According to Tom Angelripper, the second recording is "completely different" and features a bonus track named "After the Deluge".

Re-releases 
Obsessed by Cruelty was re-released together with In the Sign of Evil in 1988, containing the first recorded version, and as a picture vinyl in 2005 by Vinyl Maniacs.

Influence 
The album had a major influence on then-developing black metal. Mayhem founder and guitarist Euronymous described the early Sodom and Destruction releases as underrated "masterpieces of black stinking metal". He also named his record label, Deathlike Silence Productions, after the album's second track.

Track listing 
All music composed by Sodom (Chris Witchhunter, Michael Wulf, Tom Angelripper, Uwe Christophers).

 U.S. version

 German version

Personnel 
 Sodom
 Tom Angelripper – vocals, bass
Destructor – guitar (except "After the Deluge")
 Ahäthoor (Uwe Christophers) – guitar (on "After the Deluge")
 Witchhunter – drums

 Production
 Bobby Bachinger – engineering

References

External links 
  (American version)
  (German version)

Sodom (band) albums
1986 debut albums
SPV/Steamhammer albums
Metal Blade Records albums